The Australian Institute of Physics was established in 1963, when it replaced the Australian Branch of the British Institute of Physics based in London. The purpose of the institute is to further promote the development and application of the science of physics as well as providing support to physicists. The AIP publishes Australian Physics (ISSN 1036-3831) since 1963. Every two years, the Institute organises a national congress, the latest being held in December 2014 at the Australian National University in Canberra.

Organisation
The institute has branches in each of the six Australian states, and topical groups in the following areas:
 Atomic Physics and Molecular Physics
 Condensed Matter Physics and Materials Physics
 Nuclear Physics and Particle Physics
 Physics Education
 Quantum Information, Concepts and Quantum Coherence 
 Solar Physics, Terrestrial Physics and Space Physics
 Theoretical Physics
 Women in Physics

Presidents

1962–65 Leonard Huxley
1966–67 F. Lehany
1968 Alan Walsh
1969–70 A. Harper
1971–72 Robert Street
1973–74 F. J. Jacka
1975–76 J. Campbell
1977–78 Terry Sabine
1979–80 Herbert Bolton
1981–82 Neville Fletcher
1983–84 G. V. H. Wilson
1985–86 T. Fred Smith
1987–88 John Collins
1989–90 Anthony Klein
1991–92 Anthony Thomas
1993–94 Robert Crompton
1995–96 Ron McDonald
1997–98 Jaan Oitmaa
1999–2000 John Pilbrow
2001–02 John O'Connor
2003–04 Rob Elliman
2005–06 David Jamieson
2007–08 Cathy Foley
2009–10 Brian James
2011–12 Marc Duldig
2013–14 Robert Robinson
2015–16 Warrick Couch
2017–18 Andrew Peele
2019–20 Jodie Bradby

Awards
The Bragg Gold Medal for Excellence in Physics has been awarded since 1992 for the best PhD thesis by a student from an Australian University and to commemorate Sir Lawrence Bragg (in front on the medal) and his father Sir William Henry Bragg who both played a significant part in physics education in Australia. Winners so far are:

 1992 Dr Stephen Bass, University of Adelaide
 1993 Dr Henry Chapman, University of Melbourne
 1994 Dr Wolodymyr Melnitchouk, University of Adelaide
 1995 Dr Howard Wiseman, University of Queensland
 1996 Dr Andre Luiten, University of Western Australia
 1997 Dr Alexander Buryak, Australian National University (ANU)
 1998 Dr Tanya Monro, University of Sydney
 1999 Dr Ping Koy Lam, Australian National University
 2000 Dr Mark Oxley, University of Melbourne
 2001 Dr Nicole Bell, University of Melbourne
 2002 Dr Annette Berriman, Australian National University
 2003 Dr Michael Bromley, Charles Darwin University
 2004 Dr Warwick Bowen, Australian National University
 2005 Dr Philip Bartlett, Murdoch University
 2006 Dr Alex Argyros, University of Sydney
 2008 Dr Frank Ruess, University of New South Wales (UNSW)
 2009 Dr Christian Romer Rosberg, Australian National University
 2010 Dr Clancy William James, University of Adelaide
 2011 Dr Adrian D'Alfonso, University of Melbourne
 2012 Dr Eva Kuhnle, Swinburne University of Technology
 2013 Dr Martin Fuechsle, University of New South Wales
 2014 Dr Andrew Sutton, Australian National University
 2015 Dr Jarryd Pla, University of New South Wales

Honorary Fellows of the Australian Institute of Physics (partial list)

 David Booth
 Gordon Chapman
 Robert Crompton
 John Robert de Laeter
 Robert Delbourgo
 Geoff Forrest
 Michael Gorroick
 Tony Klein
 GC Lowenthal AM
 Arthur Page
 Brian Schmidt
 John Symonds
 Gertrud Thompson

Fellows of the Australian Institute of Physics (partial list)
 Derek Abbott
 Ronald Ernest Aitchison
 Hans A. Bachor
 Clive Baldock
 Murray Batchelor
 Nicole Bell
 David Blair
 Mahananda Dasgupta
 Robert Delbourgo
 F. J. Duarte
 Sean Cadogan
 Warrick Couch
 John Robert de Laeter
 Min Gu
 Peter Hannaford
 Arthur Robert Hogg
 Heinrich Hora
 Leonard Huxley
 Rodney Jory
 Yuri Kivshar
 Bruce Harold John McKellar
 Tanya Monro
 Brian J. Orr
 James A. Piper
 Arthur W. Pryor
 Anthony William Thomas
 John Clive Ward
 Alan Walsh
 John White

See also
 Official website

References

Physics societies
1963 establishments in Australia
Scientific organizations established in 1963
Scientific organisations based in Australia